

Canadian Football News in 1904
The value of a Try (touchdown) was increased to five points and Goals from a Try was reduced to one point in the ORFU. The QRFU adopted a rule by Tom (King) Clancy of Ottawa that a team must make five yards on its third scrimmage to keep possession of the ball.

Regular season

Final regular season standings
Note: GP = Games Played, W = Wins, L = Losses, T = Ties, PF = Points For, PA = Points Against, Pts = Points
*Bold text means that they have clinched the playoffs

League Champions

Playoffs

MRFU Tie-Breaker

Winnipeg Rowing Club wins the MRFU championship

ORFU First District Semi-Final

Toronto Torontos advance to the ORFU First District Final.

ORFU First District Final

Toronto advances to the ORFU Final.

ORFU Final - Game 1

ORFU Final - Game 2

Hamilton wins the ORFU Final.

CIRFU Final

Queen's wins the CIRFU Final.

Dominion Championship
No Dominion Final was played this year due to a rules dispute.

References

 
Canadian Football League seasons